Events from the year 1297 in Ireland.

Incumbent
Lord: Edward I

Events
The first representative Irish Parliament meets in Dublin.
County Kildare was formed by the Normans.

Births

Deaths

References

 
1290s in Ireland
Ireland
Years of the 13th century in Ireland